Domiporta gloriola, common name : the glorious mitre, is a species of sea snail, a marine gastropod mollusk in the family Mitridae, the miters or miter snails.

Description
The shell size varies between 40 mm and 67 mm

Distribution
This species occurs in the Pacific Ocean off Indonesia, Papua New Guinea and the Ryukyus, Japan

References

 Cernohorsky W. O. (1991). The Mitridae of the world (Part 2). Monographs of Marine Mollusca 4. page(s): 97

External links
 

Mitridae
Gastropods described in 1970